Cranfield Peak is a peak,  high, standing  south of Mount Weeks in the Queen Elizabeth Range. Tentatively named "Sentinel Peak" by the New Zealand Southern Survey Party of the Commonwealth Trans-Antarctic Expedition (CTAE) (1956–58), who visited it in 1958, it was renamed for Flying Officer W.J. Cranfield who, as one of the pilots operating with the CTAE, gave considerable assistance to the surveying party in this area.

References 

Mountains of the Ross Dependency
Shackleton Coast